Koćuša is a waterfall in village Veljaci located 10 km from Ljubuški, Bosnia and Herzegovina. Its height is about 5 m.

Koćuša impresses above all with its width of more than fifty meters, which together with five meters of height slopes, makes an imposing water slide.

References 

Waterfalls of Bosnia and Herzegovina
Ljubuški